The following table indicates the party of elected officials in the U.S. state of Mississippi:
Governor
Lieutenant Governor
Secretary of State
Attorney General
State Auditor
State Treasurer
Commissioner of Agriculture and Commerce
Commissioner of Insurance
Land Commissioner

The table also indicates the historical party composition in the:
State Senate
State House of Representatives
State delegation to the United States Senate
State delegation to the United States House of Representatives

For years in which a presidential election was held, the table indicates which party's nominees received the state's electoral votes.

Pre-statehood (1798–1817)

1817–1873

1879–1979

1980–present

References

See also
Elections in Mississippi

Politics of Mississippi
Government of Mississippi
Mississippi